Pawłów may refer to the following places:
 Pawłów, Łódź Voivodeship (central Poland)
 Pawłów, Chełm County in Lublin Voivodeship (east Poland)
 Pawłów, Lublin County in Lublin Voivodeship (east Poland)
 Pawłów, Lesser Poland Voivodeship (south Poland)
 Pawłów, Busko County in Świętokrzyskie Voivodeship (south-central Poland)
 Pawłów, Sandomierz County in Świętokrzyskie Voivodeship (south-central Poland)
 Pawłów, Starachowice County in Świętokrzyskie Voivodeship (south-central Poland)
 Pawłów, Szydłowiec County in Masovian Voivodeship (east-central Poland)
 Pawłów, Wołomin County in Masovian Voivodeship (east-central Poland)
 Pawłów, Gmina Nowe Skalmierzyce in Greater Poland Voivodeship (west-central Poland)
 Pawłów, Gmina Sośnie in Greater Poland Voivodeship (west-central Poland)
 Pawłów, Silesian Voivodeship (south Poland)
 Pawłów, Opole Voivodeship (south-west Poland)
 Pavliv (Radekhiv Raion), in Lviv Oblast, Ukraine